Emmanuel Alexander Erskine (19 January 1935 – 7 May 2021) was a Ghanaian military officer and politician. He was a Chief of Army Staff of the Ghana Army. He was also a commander of the United Nations Truce Supervision Organization (UNTSO) and the United Nations Interim Force in Lebanon (UNIFIL).

Early life and education
Emmanuel Erskine was born on 19 January 1935. He trained in various military institutions in the United Kingdom. He had telecommunications training at the Royal Military Academy at Sandhurst in England, completing in 1960. He was also at the Staff College, Camberley in 1968 and trained at the Royal College of Defence Studies in 1968 and 1972.

Military career

Ghana Army
Erskine was commissioned at the Royal Military Academy Sandhurst in December 1960 into the Signal Corps of the Ghana Army. He served in various capacities with the Ghana Army. He was Commanding Officer of the Ghana Signals Regiment and later Director of Communications with the Ghana Ministry of Defence. He later became Director for Operations and Planning at the same Ministry from 1971 to 1972. He was the Chief of Army Staff briefly between January and February 1972. He again held the same position from February 1973 to April 1974.

United Nations peacekeeping
Erskine served as the Chief of Staff and Deputy Force Commander of the Second United Nations Emergency Force (UNEF II) from 1974 to 1976 in Egypt. He was then appointed the Chief of Staff of the United Nations Truce Supervision Organization (UNTSO) in Israel between January 1976 and April 1978. He subsequently became the first commander of the United Nations Interim Force in Lebanon (UNIFIL) between 1978 and 1981. Erskine again occupied the position of Chief of Staff of UNTSO and was also the United Nations Secretary General's Representative for Matters relating to UN Peacekeeping Operations in the Middle East from February 1981 to May 1986.

Political career
Erskine was one of the founding members of the People's Heritage Party (PHP). He was the party's presidential candidate during the 1992 Ghanaian presidential election. He came fifth with 1.7% of the vote. The PHP later merged with the National Independence Party to form the People's Convention Party (PCP) in 1993.

National Reconciliation Commission
Erskine was one of the nine members of the National Reconciliation Commission which were appointed by the President of Ghana, John Kufuor in consultation with the Council of State of Ghana. The commission was to investigate human rights abuses committed during the five military regimes which have ruled Ghana.

General Emmanuel Erskine Research and Documentation Centre
The Centre for Peace Initiatives in Africa (CPIA) is a peace organization based in Harare, Zimbabwe. It was established in February 2001 and had Erskine as the chairman of the board of trustees. The CPIA has the General Emmanuel Erskine Research and Documentation Centre (GERDC) named in his honour and was officially opened in September 2001 by him. The GERDC also launched the General Emmanuel Erskine Annual Lecture Series. The inaugural lecture was delivered by Erskine.

Other activities
Erskine was the Chairman of the Opportunities Industrialization Centre Ghana Accra Local Programme Committee. He had been a member of the Pugwash council since 1992 and was a participant at the 50th Pugwash conference which deliberated on "Eliminating the Causes of War". He served as the Chairman of the Ghana Action Network on Small Arms (GANSA) in 2002.

Later life 
Erskine died on 7 May 2021.

Publications

References

External links
National Reconciliation Commission Report
General Emmanuel Erskine Research and Documentation Centre

|-

|-

|-

|-

Ghanaian soldiers
United Nations military personnel
Graduates of the Royal Military Academy Sandhurst
People's Heritage Party politicians
1935 births
Chiefs of Army Staff (Ghana)
Candidates for President of Ghana
2021 deaths
People from Kumasi
Ghana National College alumni